The Missa Votiva is a mass composed by the Czech Baroque composer Jan Dismas Zelenka in 1739, Dresden. The Missa Votiva is about seventy minutes long, and its twenty parts range from forty-five seconds to over seven minutes in length.

Most of the composition is very festive and played with vivacity, the last movement being set to the tune of the first and many of the other arias being in a major key. Zelenka scored this work for a standard Baroque orchestra of strings, woodwinds and brass instruments, with the choral parts sung by a choir featuring several soloists who sing their own arias besides the parts for the whole choir. Even though a mass, the work is regarded as a highly complex musical composition, featuring "polyphonic formality" as well as operatic expression.

Structure 
Kyrie
Christe eleison
Kyrie 2
Kyrie 3
Gloria
Gratias agimus tibi
Qui tollis
Qui sedes
Quoniam to solus sanctus
Cum Sancto Spiritu 1
Cum Sancto Spiritu 2
Credo
Et incarnatus est
Crucifixus
Et resurrexit
Sanctus
Benedictus
Osanna in excelsis
Agnus Dei
Dona nobis pacem

References 

1739 compositions
Masses by Jan Dismas Zelenka